Charles Schuyler De Bost (August 5, 1826 – May 26, 1895) was an American baseball pioneer, who was a player and director with the New York Knickerbockers from 1845 to 1859.

Knickerbocker Base Ball Club
De Bost played his first game for the Knickerbockers on October 31, 1845. While he left the club in 1847, he rejoined the team on June 14, 1850, and would stay until his final game in 1859. He was primarily used as a catcher, and was considered amongst the best catchers of his era. He also served as club director for a time.

De Bost is buried in Green-Wood Cemetery in Brooklyn, New York.

References

External links

1826 births
1895 deaths
19th-century baseball players
Baseball developers
New York Knickerbockers players
Baseball players from New York City
American people of Dutch descent
Schuyler family